Peter Howitt (born 5 May 1957) is a British actor and film director.

Biography

Early life
Howitt was born on 5 May 1957, the son of Frank Howitt, a renowned Fleet Street journalist who, in 1963, broke the infamous Profumo Scandal by getting the exclusive story from call girl Christine Keeler of her illicit affair with a high ranking government minister.

Howitt grew up in Eltham, London and Bromley, Kent. He was educated at Wyborne Primary School in New Eltham and Colfe's Grammar School in Lee, South London. While in Eltham he was a member of the Priory Players amateur dramatics group.  Howitt spent a brief time at Paisley Grammar School in Paisley, Scotland in 1970. He studied at the Drama Studio London in 1976.

Career
Howitt's first notable TV role was in the 1984–85 series of Yorkshire Television's long-running programme for schools How We Used To Live, where he starred alongside Brookside actress Sue Jenkins. However, he is much better known for playing Joey Boswell in the BBC TV series Bread. In 1998, he wrote and directed his first film, Sliding Doors (1998). Since then, he has directed several films, including Antitrust (2001), Johnny English (2003), Laws of Attraction (2004), and Dangerous Parking (2008). He adapted the latter film from the novel by Stuart Browne, as well as produced and directed it, and played the lead role.

Personal life
Howitt has two children, Luke (born 1990) and Amy (born 2008). He currently resides in Vancouver, British Columbia, Canada.

Filmography

Film

Television

Awards
European Film Award (1998) – European Screenwriter (Sliding Doors)
Empire Awards (1999) – Best British Director (Sliding Doors)
Shanghai International Film Festival (2001) – Jin Jue Award for Best Director (AntiTrust)
Shanghai International Film Festival (2001) – Jin Jue Award for Best Film (AntiTrust)
Tokyo International Film Festival (2007) – Best Director (Dangerous Parking)

References

External links
 

1957 births
Living people
Alumni of the Drama Studio London
English film directors
English male film actors
European Film Award for Best Screenwriter winners
Male actors from Kent
People from Eltham